Doraemon the Movie 2017: Nobita's Great Adventure in the Antarctic Kachi Kochi is a Japanese animated science-fiction film. It is the 37th installment in the Doraemon movie series. It is directed and written by Atsushi Takahashi. Takahashi was an assistant director on Hayao Miyazaki's Academy Award-winning Spirited Away.

Plot
The film starts with 100,000 years ago, Carla losing her gold ring. On the other hand, unable to endure the mid-summer heat, Doraemon transports Nobita and his friends to a huge iceberg floating in the South Pacific. While creating an amusement park with the secret gadget "Ice-Working Iron", Nobita finds a mysterious golden ring in the ice and he asks Doraemon to search how old the golden ring was. After learning that the ring was buried in Antarctica 100,000 years ago, Doraemon tells Nobita and his friends that nobody had discovered Antarctica  until 1773, Doraemon and his friends change their clothes to winter clothes and use Anywhere Door to visit Antarctica in search of its owner. They melt a blue elephant like structure whom Nobita calls Mosuke who was frozen in emice with a bag. After facing many threats they come across the ruins of a huge city buried in the ice, and then travel back in time to meet Carla and Professor Hyakkoi, who are connected to the mysterious ring and finally meet them and Carla's yellow elephant Yuka-tan similar to Mosuke; however, the group must fight for survival as Doraemon risks plunging the Earth into another ice age. When everything starts freezing, Nobita, Shizuka, Suneo, Gian, Carla, Mosuke, Doraemon and Yuka-tan decide to travel 100,000 years later to survive but Doraemon and Yuka-tan are separated from the group while they reach in future. But they are unable to go back in time since the time belt battery is empty. Back in time, Doraemon remembers Dorami's prediction that his lucky star can save him from getting frozen and freezes Yuka-tan with the bag of gadgets and the battery. Mosuke gives the bag to Nobita which was frozen with it and Nobita says Mosuke is none other than Yuka-tan frozen by Doraemon to send them the battery. Everyone travel back in time and save Doraemon and fight the ice giant. The film ends with showing Doraemon and his friends saying farewell to their friend Carla and Professor as they prepare to leave earth, after this Doraemon and his friends return to the home, Doraemon shows Nobita the planet's (where Carla and Professor lived or home planet of Carla and Professor) ice is melting and after some time the planet returns to it normal condition and in the last sentence of the film before credits, Nobita's Mom calls him and Doraemon for dinner. The planet's position was given to Doraemon by professor. Doraemon uses a telescope to view the planet.

Cast

Theme song
  by Ken Hirai.

Release 
The film was released in Japan on 4 March 2017. This movie released in India on August 14, 2022 on Hungama TV.

Box office 
Debuting on 371 screens with Toho distributing, Doraemon the Movie 2017: Great Adventure in the Antarctic Kachi Kochi earned $6.1million on 592,036 admissions in its first weekend and ranked 1 on Japanese box office. Doraemon's 37th film made highest second weekend gross and highest total after second weekend in the franchise and is the fastest Doraemon's film to reach ¥4billion milestone within 37 days of release.

Here is a table which shows the box office of this movie of all the weekends in Japan:

The film was released in China on May 30, 2017, and grossed  after completing its theatrical run.

It was released in Hong Kong on August 3, 2017, and grossed .

In South Korea, it was released on August 11, 2017, and grossed $1,042,480 after completing its theatrical run. The film also grossed $74,855 in Turkey. In total, the film grossed over  worldwide.

Other media 
A video game based on the film for the Nintendo 3DS was released in Japan on March 2, 2017.

Notes

References

External links
  
  

Great Adventure in the Antarctic Kachi Kochi
2017 anime films
Japanese animated science fiction films
2017 science fiction films
Animated films about cats
Robot films
2017 animated films
2017 films
Films set in Antarctica
Animated films about time travel
Environmental films